Nanga Parbat Mountain is located on the border of Alberta and British Columbia at the head of the Mummery Glacier, North of Golden. It was named in 1898 by J. Norman Collie after the ninth highest mountain in the world Nanga Parbat, located in the Himalayas. Collie had climbed on Nanga Parbat in 1895.


See also 
 List of peaks on the British Columbia–Alberta border

References 

Three-thousanders of Alberta
Three-thousanders of British Columbia
Canadian Rockies